Diana Myzherytska is a Ukrainian female rhythmic gymnast. She is member of Ukrainian rhythmic gymnastics national team since 2017. At the 2018 Rhythmic Gymnastics European Championships in Guadalajara she won two silver medals in team events.

References

External links 
 

1999 births
Living people
Ukrainian rhythmic gymnasts
Sportspeople from Kharkiv
Gymnasts at the 2019 European Games
European Games medalists in gymnastics
European Games silver medalists for Ukraine
Medalists at the Rhythmic Gymnastics European Championships
Medalists at the Rhythmic Gymnastics World Championships
21st-century Ukrainian women